Document #8 is the third studio album by the American screamo band Pg. 99. The album was originally released as a vinyl LP on June 13, 2001, through Robotic Empire, with various versions also be released through Electric Human Project and Scene Police. A remixed and remastered edition was released in 2005 through Robotic Empire on CD with two additional bonus tracks, "The Lonesome Waltz of Leonard Cohen" and "The List", the latter being a Filth cover. Both tracks were previously released on Document #9: A Split Personality.

The band reunited in 2011 after eight years and performed Document #8 in its entirety during Best Friends Day in Richmond, Virginia. Document #8 was also reissued on vinyl in 2011.

Track listing

Personnel
Pg.99
 Johnny Ward - drums
 Mike Casto - guitar
 George Crum - guitar
 Mike Taylor - guitar
 Cory Stevenson - bass
 Brandon Evans - bass, vocals
 Blake Midgette - vocals
 Chris Taylor - vocals

Additional personnel
 Kurt Ballou – production
 Chris Taylor – artwork
 Andy Low – layout
 Fil – photographs
 Hugel – photographs
 Olli B. – photographs

References

External links
 Document #8 at Discogs
 Document #8 at Rate Your Music
 Document #8 on Bandcamp

2001 albums
Pg. 99 albums
Albums produced by Kurt Ballou